Don't Run may refer to:

 "Don't Run" (PartyNextDoor song), a song by PartyNextDoor
 "Don't Run (Come Back to Me)", a song by KC and the Sunshine Band
 "Don't Run" (The Flash), an episode in the fourth season of The Flash

See also 
 Don't Run Away (disambiguation)
 Walk, Don't Run, a 1966 film
 "Walk, Don't Run" (instrumental), a 1954 instrumental composition Johnny Smith
 Walk, Don't Run (album), an album by the Ventures
 "Gladiators Don't Run", an episode in the fourth season of Scandal